Aiolopus longicornis is a species of grasshopper in the family Acrididae. It is a pest of millets such as sorghum in Africa.

References

Oedipodinae
Insect pests of millets